Tropheops microstoma is a species of cichlid fish endemic to Lake Malawi where it prefers sheltered bays with calm waters.  This species can reach a length of  SL.  It can also be found in the aquarium trade.

References

External links
 Photograph

microstoma
Fish of Lake Malawi
Cichlid fish of Africa
Fish described in 1935
Taxa named by Ethelwynn Trewavas
Taxonomy articles created by Polbot